Mount Sinsing is a mountain at the West Coast Division of Sabah, Malaysia.

References 

Sinsing
Sinsing
West Coast Division